Romancoke is a census-designated place on Queen Anne's in Maryland, United States, located at the southern terminus of Maryland Route 8. Romancoke was changed from an unincorporated community to a census-designated place for the 2020 Census listing a population of 1,855. The name "Romancoke" comes from the Algonquian word for "circling of the water."  William Claiborne, who founded Kent Island, also had a plantation in Virginia named Romancoke.

Romancoke was once linked with Claiborne via the Romancoke-Claiborne ferry; however, the ferry service terminated on December 31, 1952. This was five months after the Chesapeake Bay Bridge was opened. Today, Romancoke is almost purely residential and is part of Stevensville's postal area.

Demographics

2020 census

Note: the US Census treats Hispanic/Latino as an ethnic category. This table excludes Latinos from the racial categories and assigns them to a separate category. Hispanics/Latinos can be of any race.

References

External links

Romancoke on the Bay Community Website

Kent Island, Maryland
Census-designated places in Maryland
Census-designated places in Queen Anne's County, Maryland
Maryland populated places on the Chesapeake Bay